The Windmill of Wijk bij Duurstede (c. 1670) is an oil-on-canvas painting by the Dutch painter Jacob van Ruisdael. It is an example of Dutch Golden Age painting and is now in the collection of the Amsterdam Museum, on loan to the Rijksmuseum.

Subject, date, and provenance
The painting shows Wijk bij Duurstede, a riverside town about 20 kilometers from Utrecht, with a dominating cylindrical windmill, harmonised by the lines of river bank and sails, and the contrasts between light and shadow working together with the intensified concentration of mass and space.  The attention to detail is remarkable. Art historian Seymour Slive reports that both from an aeronautical engineering and a hydrological viewpoint the finest levels of details are correct, in the windmill's sails and the river's waves respectively.

It is not known for certain when Ruisdael painted the Windmill. The painting is not dated, as very few of his works are after 1653. Dating subsequent work has therefore been largely detective work and speculation. It is assumed that it was painted in 1670.

Unlike many other Ruisdaels the Windmill seems to have remained in Dutch hands. It was acquired by Adriaan van der Hoop at an unknown date, and bequeathed by him to the new Amsterdam Museum in 1854. Since 30 June 1885 it has been on loan to the Rijksmuseum in Amsterdam. Its enduring popularity is evidenced by card sales at the Rijksmuseum, with the Windmill ranking third after Rembrandt's Night Watch and Vermeer's View of Delft.

The other windmill at Wijk bij Duurstede
Ruisdael's windmill no longer stands, although its foundations can still be seen. Another windmill located a few hundred meters further is often confused with Ruisdael's. This confusion was created when Hofstede de Groot in 1911 wrote about the painting:

Similar paintings
This scene is similar to other Ruisdael panoramas of (unidentified) windmills. Ruisdael's work inspired later landscape painters such as John Constable.

References

Bibliography
Landscape with the mill near Wijk bij Duurstede, ca. 1670 in the RKD

External links 
 

1670s paintings
Paintings by Jacob van Ruisdael
Amsterdam Museum
Paintings in the collection of the Rijksmuseum
Wijk bij Duurstede
Ships in art
Works about windmills